Carlos Alberto da Silva Gonçalves Júnior (born February 22, 1988 in São Paulo), known as Carlos Alberto, is a Brazilian footballer who plays as a midfielder for Caxias.

External links

Carlos Alberto at ZeroZero

1988 births
Living people
Footballers from São Paulo
Brazilian footballers
Brazilian expatriate footballers
Association football midfielders
Campeonato Brasileiro Série A players
Campeonato Brasileiro Série B players
Campeonato Brasileiro Série C players
Campeonato Brasileiro Série D players
Maltese Premier League players
Sport Club Corinthians Paulista players
Associação Desportiva São Caetano players
Clube de Regatas Brasil players
Esporte Clube Noroeste players
Guaratinguetá Futebol players
Treze Futebol Clube players
Botafogo Futebol Clube (SP) players
Luverdense Esporte Clube players
Mogi Mirim Esporte Clube players
Club Athletico Paranaense players
Associação Portuguesa de Desportos players
Santa Cruz Futebol Clube players
Paysandu Sport Club players
Joinville Esporte Clube players
Mirassol Futebol Clube players
Campinense Clube players
Birkirkara F.C. players
Esporte Clube Santo André players
Esporte Clube Água Santa players
Sociedade Esportiva e Recreativa Caxias do Sul players
Brazilian expatriate sportspeople in Malta
Expatriate footballers in Malta